Peter or Pete Bridges may refer to:

Peter Bridges (priest) (1925–2015), English ecclesiastical figure and academic
Peter Bridges (diplomat) (born 1932), American author and diplomat
Pete Bridges, American council member and mayor of Tallapoosa, Georgia
Peter Bridges, English television sound engineer, winner at 2013 British Academy Television Craft Awards

See also
Bridges (surname)